Dickerson may refer to:

Places
In the United States:
 Dickerson, Maryland, an unincorporated place
 Dickerson Whitewater Course near Dickerson, Maryland
 Dickerson Generating Station
 Dickerson (MARC station)
 Dickerson Middle School, a middle school in Georgia
 Dickerson Chapel, a church in North Carolina

Other uses
Dickerson (surname)
Dickerson v. United States, a major U.S. Supreme Court case reaffirming the requirement of a Miranda warning